Comalapa River (Rio Comalapa) is a medium-sized stream in La Paz, El Salvador, which has large to very large quantities of fresh water year round, especially from early May through October.

References

Rivers of El Salvador